Salzigutovo (Salyoğot) is a rural locality (a village) in Kabakovsky Selsoviet, Karmaskalinsky District, Bashkortostan, Russia. The population was 265 as of 2010. There are 11 streets.

Geography 
Salzigutovo is located 33 km north of Karmaskaly (the district's administrative centre) by road. Kabakovo is the nearest rural locality.

References 

Rural localities in Karmaskalinsky District